Albert Oblinger (born 10 September 1910, date of death unknown) was an Austrian racing cyclist. He rode in the 1936 Tour de France.

References

1910 births
Year of death missing
Austrian male cyclists
Place of birth missing